Sven Ootjers (born 24 June 1973 is a Dutch track and field coach and former athlete. As an athlete he competed at high jump, 110 metres hurdles and the decathlon. He is a seven time national champion. He represented his country at the 1992 World Junior Championships in Athletics and the 1997 Summer Universiade.

He is a trainer for the elite athletes who train at AV Trias. Among the athletes he has trained are Laura de Witte, Lisanne de Witte, Owen Westerhout and Jamile Samuel.

International competitions

National titles
Dutch Indoor Athletics Championships
High jump: 1992, 1993, 1994
Heptathlon: 2001, 2004
Dutch Athletics Championships
High jump: 1992, 1994

See also
List of high jump national champions (men)

References

1987 births
Living people
Dutch athletics coaches
Dutch decathletes
Dutch male high jumpers
Dutch male hurdlers
Dutch Athletics Championships winners